Mehmed "Meša" Avdić (born 14 May 1998) is a Serbian football midfielder of Bosniak ethnicity, who currently plays for FK Radnički Zrenjanin.

Club career
Born in Novi Pazar, Avdić started playing football with local club Pazar Juniors where he stayed until 2011. Later moved to FK Novi Pazar, where he passed all youth categories joining the first team in 2016. Shortly after he signed his first three-year professional contract with the club, Avdić was loaned to Serbian League West side Jošanica on dual registration until the 2016–17 season. Avdić made his senior debut for Novi Pazar in 20 fixture of the 2016–17 season, replacing Bojan Čečarić in 79 minute of the match against Rad, played on 10 December 2016. He started his first SuperLiga match on the field in last fixture match of the regular season against Partizan. After he sued Novi Pazar for unpaid wages, he got the contract termination to the detriment of the club in July 2017.

Avdic signed for Spanish club Coruxo in the summer 2018, but left the club again at the end of the year. After leaving Spain, he signed with OFK Bečej 1918.

In the summer 2019, he joined FK Radnički Zrenjanin.

Career statistics

Club

References

External links
 
 

1998 births
Living people
Bosniaks of Serbia
Sportspeople from Novi Pazar
Association football midfielders
Serbian footballers
FK Novi Pazar players
Serbian SuperLiga players
Coruxo FC players
Serbian expatriate footballers
Serbian expatriate sportspeople in Spain
Expatriate footballers in Spain